BC „Delikatesas“ is a professional Joniškis, Lithuania basketball club, currently playing in National Basketball League.

Club achievements 
 2014-2015 season: NKL Round of 16

Team roster

Notable players and coaches 
  Andrius Šležas

External links 

Joniskis
Joniškis
Basketball teams established in 1994
1994 establishments in Lithuania
National Basketball League (Lithuania) teams